Miss International 1986, the 26th Miss International pageant, was held on 31 August 1986 at the Holland Village in Nagasaki. The pageant was hosted by Masumi Okada and the pageant won by Helen Fairbrother of England.

Results

Placements

Contestants

  - Bárbara Laszyc
  - Christine Lucinda Bucat
  - Manuela Redtenbacher
  - Nancy Maria Marcella Stoop
  - Gloria Patricia Roca
  - Kátia Marques Faria
  - Irene Elizabeth Vermuelen
  - Maria del Carmen Zapata Valencia
  - Ana Lorena González García
  - Marie Françoise Kouame
  - Pia Rosenberg Larsen
  - Helen Fairbrother
  - Maarit Hannele Salomäki
  - Catherine Lucette Billaudeau
  - Birgit Jahn (Universe '86)
  - Afrodite Panagiotou
  - Dina Ann Reyes Salas
  - Caroline Veldkamp
  - Francia Tatiana Reyes Beselinoff
  - Patty Ngai Suen-Tung
  - Ragna Saemundsdóttir
  - Poonam Pahlet Gidwant
  - Majella Byrne
  - Chava Distenfeld
  - Caterina Fanciulli
  - Rika Kobayashi
  - Kim Yoon-jung
  - Latonia Chang Pei Pei
  - Martha Cristiana Merino Ponce de León
  - Zena Grace Jenkins
  - Lisa Aquiningoc Manglona
  - Annette Bjerke
  - Nidia Esther Pérez
  - Jessie Alice Celones Dixson
  - Renata Fatla
  - Ana Rosa Pequito Antunes
  - Elizabeth Robison Latalladi
  - Kim Robertson
  - Shirley Teo Ser Lee
  - Irán Pont Gil
  - Susanna Marie Lundmark
  - Marianne Müller
  - Janthanee Singsuwan
  - Cindy Jane Williams
  - Nancy Josefina Gallardo Quiñones
  - Judith Kay Popham

1986
1986 in Japan
1986 beauty pageants
Beauty pageants in Japan